Thanbauk is a Burmese form, consisting of three lines of four syllables each. Traditionally, they are witty and epigrammic.

The rhyme is on the fourth syllable of the first line, the third syllable of the second, and on the second syllable of the third.  

Here is a modern example by Tin Moe:

References

Burmese literature
Poetic forms